Yuval Adler (born Herzliya, Israel) is an Israeli filmmaker. Adler is perhaps best known for directing Bethlehem (2013), a film for which he won the Ophir Award for best director and best screenplay. Several scenes in Bethlehem were filmed in the West Bank. It was described in Haaretz as 'one of the most powerful Israeli films ever made.'

Adler studied mathematics and physics at Tel Aviv University and received a PhD in philosophy from Columbia University in New York City.

Filmography 

 Bethlehem (2013)
 The Operative (2019)
 The Secrets We Keep (2020)
 Sympathy for the Devil (upcoming)

References 
People from Herzliya
Tel Aviv University alumni
Columbia Graduate School of Arts and Sciences alumni
Israeli television directors
Israeli film directors
Year of birth missing (living people)
Living people

External links 
 

Israeli Ashkenazi Jews